"100%" is a Swedish language song, written by Torgny Söderberg and Monica Forsberg. The song was sung by Lotta Engberg of the group Triple & Touch at the Swedish Melodifestivalen 1988, where it finished third with 47 points. The song text describes the days as a roller coaster, but it's also about love.

In 1988, the songs 100% and Lång natt mot gryning from the album 100% were also released on a single record, peaking at #13 at the Swedish singles chart.

The song was tested at Svensktoppen, where it stayed for 10 weeks during the time April 3-June 5, 1988. It charted at number one during the first two weeks.

Cover versions
In 1988, the Swedish dansband Vikingarna covered the song.
In 1989, Finnish singer Ritva Elomaa recorded a Finnish language cover version named Täydellinen onni.
Danish singer Birthe Kjær has recorded the song with lyrics in Danish.

Track listing and formats 

 Swedish 7-inch single

A. "100%" – 2:55
B. "Lång natt mot gryning" – 3:15

Charts

References 

1988 songs
1988 singles
Lotta Engberg songs
Melodifestivalen songs of 1988
Songs written by Monica Forsberg
Songs written by Torgny Söderberg
Swedish-language songs
Triple & Touch songs
Vikingarna (band) songs